Men's college basketball on television includes the broadcasting of college basketball games, as well as pre- and post-game reports, analysis, and human-interest stories. Within the United States, the college version of basketball annually garners high television ratings.

Not all games are televised. Coverage is dependent on negotiations between the broadcaster and the college basketball conference or team. In general, major programs will be televised more often than smaller programs. The televised games may change from year-to-year depending on which teams are having a strong season, although some traditional rivalry games are broadcast each year. Major match-ups between top-ranked teams or major rivals are often broadcast nationally. Some games are traditionally associated with a specific event or holiday, and viewing the game itself can become a holiday tradition for fans.

History
College basketball was first televised during the "experimental" era of television's broadcasting history, when W2XBS broadcast a men's basketball doubleheader from Madison Square Garden in New York City on February 28, 1940. Fordham University and the University of Pittsburgh played in the first game, and New York University played Georgetown University in the second game.

In 1968, the "Game of the Century", played between UCLA and Houston, was syndicated by the TVS Television Network, attracting a significant television audience. The game is widely cited as a catalyst for the explosion and expansion of the televised college basketball landscape.

Broadcast rights

Networks
In addition, some regional syndicators broadcast games on over the air television. Most notably, Raycom Sports syndicate their games to broadcast stations. ESPN Plus, which was a syndication unit of ESPN, also previously syndicated basketball games from various conferences to stations until its 2014 closure in the wake of Big 12 games moving to the ESPN cable networks, and the inception of the cable-only SEC Network. In 2014, Sinclair Broadcasting launched a new syndication programming service, the American Sports Network, to syndicate basketball games in various areas of the country, including a few NCAA Division II games (beginning in 2016).

Raycom in the early 1990s paid ABC $1.8 million for six weeks of network airtime of 26 regional games. The format allowed Raycom to control the games and sell the advertising.

Cable stations
Regional cable networks have long devoted coverage to one or two conferences. The Pac-12 and Big 12 have had deals with Fox Sports since 1996, which airs games on its regional family of networks.

In 2007, the Big Ten conference was the first to establish its own television network, the Big Ten Network. The Pac-12 Networks debuted in 2012. Two years later, ESPN and the Southeastern Conference launched the SEC Network. In August 2019, the ACC has launched the ACC Network. This network will replace the games currently broadcast by Raycom Sports.

The Big Ten has a similar regional network, with the Big Ten Network having made its debut in August 2007. Texas has their own deal which created the Longhorn Network in fall of 2011. While BYU has BYUtv, it is not a separate deal that created a regional sports network.

ESPN
ESPN has been airing regular season games since 1980, ESPN2 since 1993, ESPNU since 2005, and to a lesser extent ESPN Classic will show fewer games per season.

College basketball has been a staple for nearly the whole history of ESPN. Scotty Connal, then-vice president of the all-sports network in Bristol, Conn., offered Dick Vitale a position, shortly after being fired from the Detroit Pistons. The coverage of 
college basketball and the early rounds of the NCAA tournament increased both college basketball and ESPN's credibility.

Virtual Reality
In 2016, Fox partnered with NextVR to live stream four Big East Conference games in virtual reality.

Current lineup
By home team

 ABC/ESPN networks (ESPN/ESPN2/ESPNU/ESPNEWS/ESPN3/ESPN+): A10, ACC, American, America East, ASUN, Big 12, Big South, Big Sky, Big West, C-USA, Horizon, Ivy, MAC, MAAC, MEAC, MVC, NEC, OVC, Pac-12, Patriot League, SBC, SEC, SoCon, Southland, Summit League, SWAC, WAC and WCC

 CBS: American, Big 12, Big East, Big Ten, Pac-12, Mountain West, and SEC

 CBS/TBS/TNT/truTV: NCAA tournament

 Fox/FS1/FS2: Big East, Big Ten, Pac-12, Mountain West

 ACC Network: ACC
 Bally Sports Regional Networks: ACC, MVC and WCC
 Big Ten Network: Big Ten
 BYU TV: BYU
 CBS Sports Network: A10, Big East, C-USA, CAA, MAC, Mountain West,  MVC,  NEC, Patriot League and WCC
 FloHoops: CAA
 HBCU GO: SWAC
 Longhorn Network: Texas
 Pac-12 Network: Pac-12
 SEC Network: SEC
 USA Network: A10
 NBC: Big Ten

Postseason

NCAA tournament
In 1974, Brent Musburger started using the term March Madness when describing the tournament.

In 1991, CBS received exclusive rights to the entire tournament for the first time. Previously, ESPN had aired early round games. Beginning in 2011, CBS shared the early tournament rounds with TBS, TNT, and TruTV. The Final Four will alternate between CBS and TBS starting in 2016.

NIT
The ESPN family of networks currently air the NIT games.

CBI
AXS TV carries select games from the CBI.

CIT
CBS Sports Network has broadcast the semifinal round and championship game of CIT since 2014. The rest of the tournament games are available for free stream on the tournament website.

References

External links
1968-1981 College Basketball TV history

 
Fox Sports original programming
ESPN College Basketball
 
History of sports broadcasting